The 2012–13 SK Rapid Wien season was the 115th season in club history.

Review and events

Rapid Wien gave a contract extension to midfielder Boris Prokopič during the off-season. Rapid Wien started pre-season on 6 June 2012. Rapid hired Helmut Schulte as the new Sporting Director. However, fans were critical of the hiring and don't want him as Sporting Director.

Matches

Legend

Bundesliga

League results and fixtures

League table

Overall league table

Summary table

ÖFB-Cup

UEFA Europa League

Third qualifying round

Playoff round

Group stage

Group results

Group table

Final group table

Group table summary

Squad

Squad and statistics

Goal scorers

Transfers

Summer

In:

Out:

Winter

In:

Out:

Sources

Rapid Wien
Rapid Wien
2012-13 Rapid Wien Season